Kellys Creek may refer to:
Kellys Creek (Wollongong, New South Wales), a watercourse
Kellys Creek (West Virginia), a stream